Dr. Karni Singh Shooting Range is a shooting range in New Delhi, India. Spread over 18 acres, it is situated on South Delhi ridges in the backdrop of Adilabad Fort, near the historic Tughlaqabad Fort to its North and Surajkund Lake to its South West. It was first constructed for the 1982 Asian Games in New Delhi, and later rebuilt altogether for the 2010 Commonwealth Games. It was named after Karni Singh, who won the silver medal at the 38th World Shooting Championships at Cairo in 1962 and was the first shooter to be awarded the Arjuna Award in 1961. The reconstruction work started on 25 October 2008 and the project was completed at a cost of Rs. 150 crore in 13 months. It was dedicated to the nation on 31 January 2010 by Union Minister for Youth Affairs & Sports.

Overview

In October 2008 the structure of the range was fully demolished and was built under a project a plan costing Rs. 150 crore (U$33.8 m), it was completed in 13 months. The earlier separate ranges for Trap and Skeet were converted into new composite ranges for Trap and Skeet with scoring equipment.

For the 10-metre shooting range, a centrally air-conditioned indoor facility with complete power back-up was constructed with a capacity of maximum of 500 spectators. Two different grids will be providing electricity to ensure complete power back-up.

The trap and skeet range is an outdoor venue with only the seating area covered; the shooter though has shade on his head. There are 50 firing points for this range.

The rebuilding of the site was followed by massive plantation and beautification would to make the site more attractive. There are also plans for constructing a 200-seated hostel which will be a self-contained facility to help the campers.

It is regarded as one of the world's best shooting range by various 2010 Commonwealth Games shooters., also near by is the Asola Bhatti Wildlife Sanctuary.

References

External links
 Dr. Karni Singh Shooting Range, overview

Sports venues in Delhi
2010 Commonwealth Games venues
Shooting sports in India
1982 Asian Games
South Delhi district
Shooting ranges in India
Sports venues completed in 2010
2010 establishments in Delhi